Tyrone is an unincorporated community in Monroe County, Iowa, United States.

History
 Tyrone's population was 54 in 1902, and 52 in 1925.

The population was 35 in 1940.

References

Unincorporated communities in Monroe County, Iowa
Unincorporated communities in Iowa